The Namibia national rugby union team represents Namibia in men's international rugby union competitions nicknamed the Welwitschias, are a tier-two nation in the World Rugby tier system, and have participated in the six Rugby World Cup competitions since their first appearance in 1999. They are governed by the Namibia Rugby Union.

Namibia has been playing international rugby since the early 1900s. As well as having competed at the World Cup, Namibia annually competes in the Africa Cup. Until independence, players for Namibia were also eligible to represent South Africa, with Namibian-born Springboks including Jan Ellis.

History

1990s
Rugby union has been played in Namibia since 1916 when it was introduced by soldiers from South Africa who had invaded the German-run colony.

Before Namibia gained its independence in 1990, the team, as South West Africa, played in South Africa's domestic club competition, the Currie Cup. The team achieved their best result in the 1988 season, where they finished third.

The Namibia Rugby Union was formed in March 1990, and it joined the International Rugby Board in the same month.  Independence came too late for Namibia to qualify for the 1991 Rugby World Cup. Hardened by regular, tough competition in the Currie Cup, the first few years of Namibian rugby union were relatively successful, their highest point being 2–0 home series victories over Ireland and Italy in 1991. That year the Welwitschias won all 10 of their Tests, the others being five victories against Zimbabwe and one against Portugal in Lisbon. One of Namibia's players, Andre Stoop was signed by English champion rugby league club, Wigan.

During the international seasons Namibia played six games; the first of which was a 55–23 win over Zimbabwe. Following another victory over Zimbabwe, in 1993 Namibia played Wales in Windhoek, losing 23–38. Namibia completed big victories over the Arabian Gulf rugby team, Kenya and Zimbabwe in the initial rounds of 1995 Rugby World Cup qualifying.

Russia toured Namibia in 1994, defeating the home team 31–12 in Windhoek. Although Namibia defeated Zimbabwe that year, the team lost to Côte d'Ivoire and drew with Morocco (all in Casablanca). In 1996 Namibia played two matches; losing 13–15 to Zimbabwe, and then defeating them by one point in a subsequent meeting. They played two games in 1997 as well, losing to Tonga and Zimbabwe.

During 1998 Namibia took part in the African tournaments for 1999 Rugby World Cup qualification. They started out in Round 3, where they finished second in the pool behind Zimbabwe on points difference (defeating Zimbabwe but losing to Tunisia). Namibia defeated Côte d'Ivoire, Morocco and Zimbabwe to qualify for the 1999 Rugby World Cup.

The team's participation was put in doubt when the Namibian government's Sports Commission barred the team from participating in a South African competition it had been using as preparation, and threatened to stop the team from taking part in the World Cup. This followed criticisms from non-white rugby clubs that the Namibian Rugby Union displayed racist attitudes. Ultimately, however, the team were allowed to take part.

The 1999 World Cup marked their debut at the tournament and since then they have been Africa's second representative alongside South Africa. While they suffered heavy defeats by France, Fiji and Canada, they took pride in scoring an early try and being level with France after 20 minutes.

2000–present
With a small player base, and lacking frequent or strong competition, the team has deteriorated in the 21st century. Their record in the World Cups has been poor as they have not yet managed a win. Their record defeat, 142–0 against Australia in the 2003 tournament, led to some questioning the presence of the minor teams at the tournament.

Namibia initially struggled in the qualifiers for the 2007 tournament, suffering a shock defeat to Kenya, their first ever to the African Great Lakes nation, and another to Tunisia. Following the Kenya loss, the Namibian squad slumped to 28th in the IRB rankings. However, after defeating Tunisia at home, the team was effectively through to two deciding matches against Morocco, to determine which of the two African nations would make it to France in 2007. Namibia convincingly won both legs, qualifying for the World Cup.

As the lowest ranked team at the start of the 2007 World Cup, Namibia was given no chance in its opening game of against Ireland. However, the Namibian squad frustrated Ireland, then the 5th ranked team in the world, and scored two tries for its narrowest World Cup loss of 17–32. They were convincingly beaten in their games with Argentina (63–3) and France (87–10). And, in the game in which they were seen as having the best chance to win, they suffered a disappointing 30–0 loss to Georgia, to end the tournament winless.

The African side was able to win the IRB Nations Cup in 2010.

Namibia achieved their fourth World Cup qualification in a row after defeating Côte d'Ivoire in 2011. They were drawn into Pool D, with South Africa, Wales, Fiji and Samoa. Their first match in the Rugby World Cup, held in New Zealand (at the Rotorua International Stadium) resulted in a defeat by Fiji by 45–29. Their second match in this tournament was a 49–12 loss to Samoa but the third was an 87–0 loss to South Africa. In their final pool game, Wales proved to be too strong, as Namibia conceded 12 tries in an 81–7 defeat. Theuns Kotzé provided his side's one consolation, as his conversion of a Heinz Koll try made him Namibia's all-time highest Rugby World Cup points scorer.

The Welwitschias played the 2015 Vodacom Cup, collecting six defeats and one win against the Limpopo Blue Bulls. Namibia qualified for their fourth Rugby World Cup in 2015. They were placed in Pool C with New Zealand, Georgia, Tonga and Argentina. They managed to lose to Georgia by a single point (17-16), their best result ever and winning their first bonus point at the competition.

They qualified for the 2019 Rugby World Cup for the sixth time by winning the Rugby Africa Gold Cup and joined pool B along with South Africa, New Zealand, Italy and Canada. The team lost to New Zealand, South Africa and Italy, while the match versus Canada was cancelled because of Typhoon Hagibis.

Wins against Tier 1 nations

South West Africa Record vs Touring Teams
Before independence Namibia played as South West Africa and played touring teams who toured South Africa.

Record

Below is table of the representative rugby matches played by a Namibia national XV at test level up until 1 July 2022.

Players

Current squad
On 7 November, Allister Coetzee named a 30-man squad for Namibia's End-of-Year matches against Spain and Canada.

Head Coach:  Allister Coetzee
 Caps Updated: 10 November 2022

Individual all-time records

Most caps

Last updated: 19 November 2022

Most tries

Last updated: 12 November 2022

Most points

Most points in a match

Most tries in a match

Most matches as captain

Past Coaches
Since the 1999 Rugby World Cup

See also
 Namibia Rugby Union
 Rugby union in Namibia

Notes

External links
 Namibianrugby.com
 A place to meet and chat about namibian rugby.
 Namibian rugby union news from Planet Rugby
 Namibia World Cup 2007 Preview (in Portuguese)
 Namibia World Cup 2007 Preview & follow-up (in French)

 
African national rugby union teams